Gran Hermano 11 launched on September 6, 2009, with the final on January 27, 2010, lasting 144 days, making it the longest season to date. It is the eleventh Spanish edition of the reality franchise Big Brother. Mercedes Milá returned as the main host of the show, also known as the Gala, which consists of both the nominations and the eviction.

The grand prize this season is €50,000 more compared to the last season, totalling to €350,000; there will be a second and third prize with €70,000 and €30,000 being given respectively. One week after the season ended, an All-Stars edition - Gran Hermano: El Reencuentro premiered which featured housemates Arturo and Indhira returned to the house.

In the 2019 season "Gran Hermano Duo", Carolina returned to the house.

The House 
As part of the twist for Gran Hermano 11, a secret "Spy House" was built next to the actual house. Eleven housemates entered the main Gran Hermano House on the night of the premiere; six other Housemates entered the Spy House and remained there until further notice, until then, they were immune from nominations and evictions.

On Day 18, three more housemates entered the Spy House.

On Day 46, as the concept of the Spy House ended, all housemates from both houses resided in the Spy House which became the permanent house.

On Day 67, the first seven evicted housemates returned to the main Gran Hermano House for the chance to once again earn housemate status, with three of the evicted housemates vying to win at least one of the three 'vote to save' rounds by the public, the evicted housemates themselves, and the housemates already living in the house by Day 74.

On Day 137, for the final week, the final three housemates moved back into the main house.

Housemates
This season featured many 'firsts' for Gran Hermano including the most housemates entering on premiere night to date, with 17, including the first mother-daughter housemate, a disabled housemate, and a gay couple.

Rebeca, Nagore, Indhira, Tatiana, Carolina and Saray appeared naked on Interviú (popular magazine that does naked artistic photography to the famous people)
On February 3, 2010, a week after the season ended, an All Stars edition - Gran Hermano: El Reencuentro premiered which featured Arturo and Indhira returning at the house.
Tatiana was in Las Joyas de la Corona on 2010.
Indhira was 'tronista' of Mujeres y Hombres y Viceversa on 2011.
Saray and Gerardo were on Gran Hermano: El Reencuentro 2011(All Stars 2011)
Nagore won Acorralados on 2011 with 56% of the votes. Now she is an adviser of Mujeres y Hombres y Viceversa.
Arturo was in Supervivientes: Perdidos en Honduras on 2011. He was on ¡Mira quién salta! on 2014.
Carolina Sobe was on Supervivientes: Perdidos en Honduras on 2014. Now she is an adviser of Mujeres y Hombres y Viceversa.
Rebeca and Siscu recorded porn movies in Crapulosos.com

Ángel
Ángel is a male housemate who entered on Day 1 into the Spy House. On Day 1, he was assigned a secret task to pretend he and Lis were in a relationship. On Day 25, during Nagore's eviction, she chose Ángel to enter the main Gran Hermano house. In the principal house, he formed part of the group of the nice ones. On Day 53, the housemates voted for a fellow housemate to win a trip to Peru; Angel won the vote. He had many problems with Hans, Arturo and Gerardo. He had a nice friendship with Tatiana. On Day 143, the final day of Gran Hermano 11, Ángel was named the winner with 78.5% of the winning vote winning the €350,000 grand prize.

Ángela
Ángela is a female housemate who entered on Day 1 into the Spy House. She is married to female housemate Laura. Initially, Ángela was simply a guest on behalf of Laura on the premiere of the eleventh season but was given the chance to become a housemate by Gran Hermano host Mercedes Milá; on Day 1, Ángela and Laura were told to keep their relationship as a secret. On Day 11, Ángela was ejected from the house as fellow Spy Housemate Lis figured out that Ángela and Laura were indeed a couple. On Day 95, Angela was briefly reunited with Laura after 84 days as an early surprise Christmas present by Gran Hermano.

Arturo
Arturo is a male housemate who entered on Day 1 in the main Gran Hermano house. In the principal house, he formed part of the group of the nice ones. On Day 39, after being told he survived the fifth eviction of the season, he moved to the Spy House to decide whether Spy Housemates Carol or Carolina should become official/permanent housemates; on Day 46, he was the only housemate to vote for Carol to stay, hence Carol was evicted. He has developed a relationship with Indhira and during the last couple weeks of his stay with Tatiana. He liked Carol. He was confrontational with Nagore, Juan, Gerardo and Ángel. He was evicted on Day 123 with 61.83% of the public vote.

Carol
Carol is a female housemate who entered on Day 18 in the main Gran Hermano house but quickly moved to the Spy House. On Day 46, she was evicted after receiving the fewest save votes from Arturo, Indhira, Tatiana, and Toscano where she only earned Arturo's vote for the chance to become an official housemate and no longer a Spy Housemate. She received a mixed reaction to heavy boos at the start of her eviction interview particularly due to romancing Arturo. On Day 67, Carol returned to the main Gran Hermano 11 house with previously evicted housemates for another chance to become an official housemate; on Day 74, Carol received the most save votes from the online-public vote to re-enter the house with 37% of the vote. In Week 14, she was nominated for eviction for the first time by the housemates and was evicted on Day 102 with 64.3% of the public vote.

Carolina
Carolina is a female housemate who entered on Day 18 in the main Gran Hermano house but quickly moved to the Spy House. She met Ángel on Big Brother's selection of game players. On Day 46, she received the most save votes from Indhira, Tatiana, and Toscano to become an official housemate and no longer a Spy Housemate, only losing Arturo's vote. She was a very charismatic person, but she had a few unfortunate comments on cancer. She was making be called "Drag Queen". She was evicted on Day 81 with a 50,3%.

Gerardo
Gerardo is a male housemate who entered on Day 18 in the main Gran Hermano house but quickly moved to the Spy House. On Day 32, following Rebeca's eviction, she chose Gerardo to move into the main house. On Day 119, it was revealed that he and Saray will take part of a duo Housemate Exchange with the Grande Fratello house in Italy despite being nominated for eviction for the week; he did survive the eviction and celebrated in the Grande Fratello house by jumping into the pool. In Italy, Saray and Gerardo started a relationship. He has received the most nominations and faced the public vote nine times, the most in Gran Hermano history. On Day 137, he was the last evictee before the final with 85.3%. He said that he had managed to be a reserve of another previous edition of Gran Hermano.

Gonzalo
Gonzalo is a male housemate from Argentina who entered on Day 1 in the main Gran Hermano house. He was one of the leaders of The group of the snubs. On Day 11, he was ejected from the house for aggressive and threatening behavior, particularly towards Pilarita.

Hans
Hans is a male housemate who entered on Day 1 in the Spy House. On Day 1, he was told of all the secrets that his fellow housemates in the Spy House have been assigned. It has been revealed, and confirmed by his mother, that Hans is a transsexual; this was not revealed to the house though. On Day 11, evicted housemate Pilarita chose Hans to enter the main house. Out of the contest, Lis declared that Saray had ordered her mother to choose Hans. In the principal house he formed a part of the group of the nice ones. During week four, Hans revealed that he is a transsexual, to Saray. After being nominated four times for eviction, he was the eighth housemate evicted on Day 67.

Indhira
Indhira is a female housemate who entered on Day 1 in the main Gran Hermano house. In the principal house he formed a part of the group of the nice ones. On Day 39, after being told she survived the fifth eviction of the season, she moved to the Spy House to decide whether Spy Housemates Carol or Carolina should become official/permanent housemates; on Day 46, she voted for Carolina to stay in the house, and Carol was evicted. In the early hours of Day 82, Indhira had an argument with Carol (who returned to the house the previous week) which resulted in Indhira throwing a glass full of ice towards her; moments after, she became the first female ever on Gran Hermano to be ejected for aggressive behavior. She developed an on and off relationship with Arturo and was considered a front runner to win.

Juan
Juan is a male housemate who entered on Day 1 in the main Gran Hermano house. In the principal house he formed a part of the group of the snubs. He was the strategic leader. He was nominated for the fifth eviction and became the fifth evictee on Day 39. On Day 67, he returned to the main Gran Hermano house with other evicted housemates for a chance to become a housemate again; he lost the three rounds of voting and was re-evicted on Day 74. It has been revealed that he has multiple sclerosis.

Laura
Laura is a female housemate who entered on Day 1 into the Spy House. She is married to fellow female housemate Angela; on Day 1, Ángela and Laura were told to keep their relationship as a secret; on Day 12, Angela was ejected from the house as Lis figured out their secret. On Day 39, following Juan's eviction, he chose Laura to enter the main house. She was best friend of Saray. Eighty-four days after her wife was ejected on Day 95, Laura was briefly reunited with Angela as an early Christmas gift by Gran Hermano. After 102 days in the Gran Hermano house, Laura received enough nominations to face her first public vote for Week 15 and was subsequently evicted on Day 112.

Lis
Lis is a female housemate who entered on Day 1 into the Spy House. She was assigned a secret task to pretend that she and Angel are in a relationship. She demonstrated to be the good one player and discovered the secret of Ángela and Laura between Days 8 and 11. On the very early hours of Day 12, Lis walked from the Spy House, mainly after a confrontation by Laura and being shunned by her fellow Spy Housemates. She stopped being present at the set of the program because she was not comfortable.

Melanie
Melanie is a female housemate who entered on Day 1 into the main Gran Hermano house. In the principal house he formed a part of the group of the snubs. She was nominated for the first time on the seventh eviction and became the seventh evictee on Day 53. On Day 67, she returned to the main Gran Hermano house with other evicted housemates for a chance to become a housemate again; she lost the three rounds of voting and was re-evicted on Day 74. She was considered by his companions as a silly girl who was manipulated by Nagore.

Nagore
Nagore is a female housemate who entered on Day 1 into the main Gran Hermano house. She was the leader of the group of the snubs. She had a strong personality. In Week 3, on a group consensus, Nagore was nominated for eviction which garnered rapturous applause from the audience and heard into the house. She was evicted on Day 25 with a mixed to negative reception from the audience and with a Gran Hermano record-breaking 95% of the public vote, breaking Ángela of Gran Hermano 9's 92.7%. Nagore is currently tied with Big Brother 5 Brazil's Aline with the highest eviction percentage ever in the world of Big Brother/Gran Hermano. On Day 67, she returned to the main Gran Hermano house with other evicted housemates for a chance to become a housemate again; she lost the three rounds of voting to re-enter the house and was re-evicted on Day 74, coming in second place in all three rounds.

Pilarita
Pilarita is a female housemate who entered on Day 1 into the main Gran Hermano House. She is the mother of fellow housemate Saray, who entered the Spy House on Day 1. Both Pilarita and Saray were unaware that they are both living in separate houses as they were separated moments before entering the house. In the principal house he formed a part of the group of the nice ones. She received the most nominations during the first round of nominations along with Indhira and evicted on Day 11. Before properly leaving the house, she entered the Spy House where she was reunited with Saray for a few minutes. Pilarita had to then choose either Spy Housemates Lis or Hans to enter the main house, she chose Hans, and Pilarita was finally free to leave the house. On Day 67, she returned to the main Gran Hermano house with other evicted housemates for a chance to become a housemate again; on Day 74, the official housemates voted for Pilarita to return to the house. In Week 15's nominations, Gran Hermano automatically nominated Pilarita for revealing information from the outside world with Saray. She is the first housemate that had re-entered the house to make it to the final where she ultimately lasted third place earning the €30,000 prize, however, as she did not spend the full 143 days in the house compared to other housemates, she will only receive a proportion of the prize.

Rebeca
Rebeca is a female housemate who entered on Day 1 into the main Gran Hermano house. She entered the house with her small doll named Rosita. She baptized to both groups of the house as The group of the nice ones and The group of the snubs. She was nominated for the fourth eviction after abandoning all of her old friends (the nice ones) and aligning herself with their nemesis. She was evicted on Day 32 with 92.5% of the eviction vote. On Day 67, she returned to the main Gran Hermano house with other evicted housemates for a chance to become a housemate again; on Day 74, she was re-evicted after losing three rounds of voting for the chance to re-enter.

Saray
Saray is a female housemate who entered on Day 1 into the Spy House. She is the daughter of fellow housemate Pilarita, who entered in the main Gran Hermano house on Day 1 as well. Saray was told that her mother is an official contestant in Gran Hermano but must keep it a secret as she is in the Spy House. On Day 11, all secrets were suspended and Saray was briefly reunited with her mother who just got evicted moments before. On Day 18, following Siscu's eviction, Saray moved into the main Gran Hermano house. In the principal house he formed a part of the group of the nice ones. On Day 119, it was revealed she will be going to the Grande Fratello house in Italy with Gerardo as part of a duo Housemate Exchange. In Grande Fratello, Saray started a relationship with Gerardo. Saray is the first housemate in Gran Hermano history to never be nominated for the public vote throughout the entire season until the final week. On Day 143, Saray was named the runner-up with 19.6%, losing to Ángel, but winning the €70,000 prize for second place. She said that she had managed to be a reserve of Gran Hermano 9.

Siscu
Siscu is a male housemate who entered on Day 1 into the main Gran Hermano house. In the principal house he formed a part of the group of the nice ones. He was nominated for the second eviction by Gran Hermano as a disciplinary punishment (a Gran Hermano first) due to an altercation with Gonzalo and became the second person to be evicted by the public vote on Day 18. On Day 67, he returned to the main Gran Hermano house with other evicted housemates for a chance to become a housemate again; on Day 74, he received the most save votes from the evicted housemates to earn official housemate status. He was re-evicted on Day 119, making him the first housemate ever to be evicted twice via the public vote in Gran Hermano history.

Tatiana
Tatiana is a female housemate originally from Russia, and the youngest housemate this season who entered on Day 1 into the main Gran Hermano house. In the principal house he formed a part of the group of the snubs. In Week 5, she was nominated for eviction for the first time; on Day 39, she was told she survived the eviction and was moved into the Spy House to decide whether Spy Housemates Carol or Carolina should become official/permanent housemates; on Day 46, she voted for Carolina to stay. During the last few couple weeks of her stay, she developed a relationship with Arturo, which some considered to be a downturn to her popularity as she was considered a contender to win following Indhira's ejection. She was evicted on Day 130 with 50% of the three-way public vote.

Toscano
Toscano is a male housemate who entered on Day 1 into the main Gran Hermano house becoming the first disabled person ever in Gran Hermano. At the age of 16, he suffered a motorcycle accident and was reliant on a wheelchair thereafter. In the principal house he formed a part of the group of the snubs. In Week 5, he was nominated for the first time, by ex-housemate Nagore who voted on behalf of Melanie for 'being false'; on Day 39, he survived the public vote and was moved to the Spy House to decide whether Spy Housemates Carol or Carolina should become official/permanent housemates; on Day 46, he voted for Carolina to stay. He was evicted for 'being false' on Day 88 with 42.4% in a three-way public vote.

Housemate Exchange
On December 17, 2009 (Day 102), it was revealed by host Mercedes Milá that a housemate exchange with another Big Brother country will take place soon. A few days later during El Debate, it was revealed Gran Hermano will exchange two housemates with ItalyGrande Fratello; the decision most likely as the television station that programs the Spanish and Italian versions of Big Brother are owned by the same company, Mediaset. On December 29, during El Debate, it was shown that Italian housemates Carmela and Massimo will take part of the exchange; they arrived in the Gran Hermano house on January 3, 2010 (Day 119), the same day as it was announced that Saray and Gerardo will take their place. Saray and Gerardo arrived into the Grande Fratello house the next evening during the Gala of Grande Fratello and left on January 9. Carmela and Massimo left the Gran Hermano house early January 10 (Day 126); later that night, Saray and Gerardo returned to the Gran Hermano house.

Nominations

 Housemates In Spy House
 Nominate/vote to save

Notes

El Debate: Blind Results
Gran Hermano presents 'El Debate' on Sunday nights presented by Jordi González, a debate show featuring the latest evictee and special guests; blind results shows the progress of the public vote for the next eviction show but doesn't reveal which housemate has the percentage.

Blind Results Notes

  Week 6 did not include the public vote as the housemates will be doing the evicting between Carol and Carolina.
  The eighth round of nominations took place during week nine, as there we no nominations on week 8.
  The public were voting on which ex-housemate should return to the house via online voting, rather than the usual calling or texting.
  The eleventh round of nominations consisted of four nominees for eviction, but as Indhira (one of the nominees), was ejected from the house, the public resumed voting with the remaining three nominees. 
  The public was voting for who they want to win. Only the percentage for 3rd place was revealed; the percentage of the runner-up and winner was not revealed.

See also
 Main Article about the show

External links
 Gran Hermano 11 Official Website at Telecinco
 Gran Hermano Main Site

2009 Spanish television seasons
2010 Spanish television seasons
GH 11